NET was a Brazilian telecommunications company that offered services such as cable television, broadband internet and telephony. The company's NET TV service (cable TV) had around 5.4 million subscribers as of Q2 2012. NET also operated the broadband Internet service NET Vírtua, with over 9 million subscribers as of Q2 2019 and telephone over cable (under the NET Fone via Embratel name) with more than 2.5 million subscribers. It is owned by Mexican telecom giant América Móvil. On 11 July 2019, the NET brand was absorbed into the Claro brand, already used by América Móvil for its mobile business in Latin America.

History
NET was launched on 12 December 1991 by Brazil's Roberto Marinho family's as part of their Rede Globo empire. In March 2005, Embratel, a subsidiary of Mexico's Telmex, took a controlling stake in NET, paying 570 million reais.

The company announced in late 2006 that it would buy Vivax, then the nation's second-largest cable company. The transaction was approved in May 2007 and completed in June 2007. Rollout of the Net brand in Vivax areas was completed in December 2007.

On 10 August 2010, NET became the first cable operator in Brazil to offer all the Discovery Latin America channels: Discovery Channel, Animal Planet, Discovery Kids, People+Arts, Discovery Travel & Living, Discovery Home & Health, Discovery Science, Discovery Civilization, Discovery Turbo, HD Theater and TLC.

NET Vírtua
The broadband service currently offers the following speeds: 2 Mbps, 15 Mbps, 35 Mbps,
120 Mbps and 240 Mbps in almost every location from the company's coverage area. Also they offer 500 Mbps based on FTTH in some locations.

Coverage
Currently, Vírtua is available in many cities of 21 states, like Alagoas, Amazonas, Bahia, Ceará, Espírito Santo, Goiás, Minas Gerais, Maranhão, Mato Grosso, Mato Grosso do Sul, Pernambuco, Pará, Paraíba, Paraná, Piauí, Rio Grande do Norte, Rio Grande do Sul, Santa Catarina, São Paulo and Rio de Janeiro, plus Distrito Federal.

In 2018, they started to cover new cities with FTTH instead of HFC, as of August 2019, there were 51 cities covered with FTTH by Claro NET.

See also

 List of internet service providers in Brazil

References

External links
 

Companies formerly listed on the Nasdaq
América Móvil
Cable television companies of Brazil
Internet service providers of Brazil
Companies based in São Paulo